Blumenberg may refer to:

Blumenberg (surname)
Blumenberg, Cologne, part of Chorweiler, Cologne, Germany
Blumenberg (quarry), near Eichstätt, Bavaria, Germany, notable as a site of fossil discoveries
Blumenberg, village in Wanzleben-Börde, Saxony-Anhalt, Germany
Blumenberg, German name of the town now known as Florimont, Territoire de Belfort, Franche-Comté, France

Hans Blumenberg, 20th century German philosopher
Blumenberg, 2011 novel by Sibylle Lewitscharoff

See also 
Blumberg, a municipality in Baden-Württemberg, Germany
Blumberg (surname)